The R690 road is a regional road in County Tipperary, Ireland. It travels from the R689 road to the N76 at Ninemilehouse, via the village of Mullinahone.

References

Regional roads in the Republic of Ireland
Roads in County Tipperary